The women's long jump at the 1982 European Athletics Indoor Championships was held on 6 March.

Results

References

Long jump at the European Athletics Indoor Championships
Long